The Kentucky Medal of Honor Memorial is located at the corner of Fifth and Jefferson Streets in downtown Louisville, Kentucky, on the grounds of the old Jefferson County Courthouse. The Memorial honors all recipients of the Medal of Honor from the Commonwealth of Kentucky. The  Memorial was sculpted by Doyle Glass and dedicated on Veterans Day 2001. The Memorial features a life-size bronze statue of Medal of Honor recipient John C. Squires as he would appear on the night he earned the Medal of Honor. Squires, a native of Louisville, was killed in action in Italy during World War II. The statue of Squires stands on a  granite base. A plaque on the base lists the names of each recipient of the Medal of Honor from Kentucky.

Recipients of the Medal of Honor from Kentucky

Civil War 1861-1865
Army Captain William P. Black
Army Private John H. Callahan
Army Sergeant John S. Darrough
Army Private John Davis
Army Drummer William H. Horsfall
Army Private Aaron Hudson
Army Private Henry B. Mattingly
Army Sergeant Francis M. McMillen
Navy Landsman Daniel Noble
Army Private Oliver P. Rood
Army Sergeant Andrew J. Smith
Army Private William Steinmetz
Army Doctor Mary E. Walker
Army Major John F. Weston
Army Colonel James A. Williamson

Indian Campaigns 1870-1891
Army Second Lieutenant Thomas Cruse
Army First Sergeant William L. Day
Army Corporal John J. Givens
Army Private William M. Harris
Army Captain John B. Kerr
Army Private Franklin M. McDonald
Army Private George D. Scott
Army Sergeant Thomas Shaw
Army Private Thomas W. Stivers
Army Private Thomas Sullivan
Army Saddler Otto E. Voit
Army Sergeant Brent Woods

Actions in Peacetime 1871-1910
Navy Seaman Edward W. Boers
Navy Watertender Edward A. Clary
Navy Quarter Gunner George Holt

Wars of American Expansion 1897-1902
Army Colonel J. Franklin Bell
Army First Lieutenant Benjamin F. Hardaway
Army Private James J. Nash

World War I 1917-1919
Army Sergeant Willie Sandlin

World War II 1941-1945
Marine Corps Corporal Richard E. Bush
Army First Lieutenant Garlin Murl Conner
Army Technical Sergeant Morris E. Crain
Marine Corps Private First Class Leonard F. Mason
Marine Corps Reserve Private First Class Wesley Phelps
Army Private Wilburn K. Ross
Marine Corps Private First Class Luther Skaggs Jr.
Army Staff Sergeant Junior J. Spurrier
Army Sergeant John C. Squires

Korean War 1950-1953
Marine Corps Captain William E. Barber
Marine Corps Private First Class William B. Baugh
Army Corporal John W. Collier
Army First Lieutenant Carl H. Dodd
Army Second Lieutenant Darwin K. Kyle
Army Private First Class David M. Smith
Army Private First Class Ernest E. West

Vietnam War 1961-1975
Army Sergeant Charles C. Fleek
Army Staff Sergeant Don Jenkins
Army Private First Class Billy L. Lauffer
Army Sergeant First Class Gary L. Littrell
Army Second Lieutenant John J. McGinty III
Army Private First Class David P. Nash
Marine Corps Lance Corporal Joe C. Paul

Operation Enduring Freedom 2001–Present
Marine Corps Sergeant Dakota Meyer

See also
 2001 in art
Medal of Honor Memorial (Indianapolis)
 Oregon Veterans Medal of Honor Memorial
Texas Medal of Honor Memorial

References

Medal of Honor
Military monuments and memorials in the United States
Monuments and memorials in Kentucky
Buildings and structures in Louisville, Kentucky
2001 sculptures
Outdoor sculptures in Kentucky
Bronze sculptures in Kentucky
Public art in Louisville, Kentucky
Statues in Kentucky
Sculptures of men in Kentucky
2001 establishments in Kentucky